This is a list of ministries in the Cabinet of Kenya which help lead the Government of Kenya.

Ministers
There are currently 21 ministries in the Cabinet of Kenya.

See also 
Parliament of Kenya
Senate of Kenya
National Assembly of Kenya
Cabinet of Kenya
Government of Kenya

References

External links 
 myGovernment | Kenya
 The Presidency | Kenya

Government of Kenya